The M12 is a  length of spur motorway in County Armagh, Northern Ireland. It was opened in 1970.

It leads off the main M1 motorway, to Portadown, part of the conurbation of Portadown-Craigavon-Lurgan, and forms most of the route between junction 11 of the M1 (Ballynacor) and the A3 Northway at Kernan Loop. The road forms part of European route E18.

History

The M12 is a legacy from the 1960s plan to develop the Craigavon new town. The M1 motorway was originally intended to run between Belfast, and the area that is now Craigavon. By the early 1960s, the M1 project had been extended further westwards to reach Dungannon, and the M12 was planned to connect Craigavon to the M1. The junction between the M12 and M1 originally had slip roads for traffic to and from Belfast only, but a bridge was built as part of the project for completion of the junction as full access.

Construction on the new Brownlow suburb of the town began in the late 1960s but by the 1980s it was clear that, due to overestimated population predictions, the new town had largely failed and construction on the remaining three suburbs never took place. The original plan to upgrade the Northway to motorway standard and give it free-flow connections to the M12 has consequently never happened.

The single-carriageway link road connecting it to the A3 was completed in 1970. West-facing connections to the M1 were added in 1990. The east and west sliproads now meet at an at-grade roundabout which was designated junction 1. The Carn junction was re-numbered junction 2 at this time.

Junctions

See also
List of motorways in the United Kingdom
Roads in Ireland

References

External links

Northern Ireland Roads Site – M12
CBRD Motorway Database – M12
The Motorway Archive – M1/M12

Motorways in Northern Ireland
Roads in County Armagh